Henry VI may refer to:

 Henry VI, Holy Roman Emperor (1165–1197)
 Henry VI, Count Palatine of the Rhine (ruled 1212–1214)
 Henry VI, Count of Luxembourg (crowned 1281, died 1288)
 Henry VI the Older (before 1345 – 1393)
 Henry VI, Count of Gorizia (1376–1454)
 Henry VI of England (1421–1471)
 Henry VI (play), a series of three plays by William Shakespeare
 Henry VI, Burgrave of Plauen (1536–1572)
 Henri, Count of Paris (1908–1999), Orleanist claimant, numbered as King Henry VI of France